McFaddin is a surname of Scottish origin. The name is derived from the Gaelic "Mac Phaidin", which means "son of little Patrick". The McFaddin family is said to have originated from the area around Loch Fyne in Argyll, Scotland.

The McFaddin family has a long and storied history. They were known for their military prowess and many members of the family served in the Scottish military throughout the centuries. The family also had strong ties to the Church of Scotland, and many members served as ministers or other prominent figures within the church.

In the 19th and early 20th centuries, many members of the McFaddin family emigrated from Scotland to North America. They settled primarily in the southern United States, particularly in Texas and Louisiana. Today, there are many descendants of the McFaddin family living in these areas.
William M. McFaddin (1819–1898)
William Perry Herring McFaddin (1856–1935)

See also
McFaddin, Texas, unincorporated community in Victoria County, Texas, United States
McFaddin-Ward House, Beaux-Arts colonial style house in Beaumont, Texas
McFaddin National Wildlife Refuge, located on the northern Gulf Coast of Texas, United States

References